Julio José Luis Álvarez Pinto (born 1964) is a Chilean lawyer who was elected as a member of the Chilean Constitutional Convention.

References

External links
 

Living people
1964 births
21st-century Chilean politicians
Pontifical Catholic University of Chile alumni
Complutense University of Madrid alumni
Members of the Chilean Constitutional Convention
Socialist Party of Chile politicians